St. John the Divine Episcopal Church, also known as St. John's Episcopal Church, is a church in Moorhead, Minnesota, United States.  It was built 1898–99 in Shingle Style and is considered Moorhead's leading architectural landmark and one of Cass Gilbert's most interesting churches.  It was listed on the National Register of Historic Places in 1980.

Unlike all other episcopal churches in Minnesota, it is part of the Episcopal Diocese of North Dakota because of its proximity to Fargo.

Its design was the basis for design of St. George's Episcopal Memorial Church in Bismarck, North Dakota, which was completed in 1949 and was listed on the National Register in 2021.

References

19th-century Episcopal church buildings
Buildings and structures in Clay County, Minnesota
Cass Gilbert buildings
Episcopal church buildings in Minnesota
Churches on the National Register of Historic Places in Minnesota
Churches completed in 1898
Moorhead, Minnesota
1898 establishments in Minnesota
National Register of Historic Places in Clay County, Minnesota